In chemistry, a mixture is a material made up of two or more different chemical substances which are not chemically bonded. A mixture is the physical combination of two or more substances in which the identities are retained and are mixed in the form of solutions, suspensions and colloids.

Mixtures are one product of mechanically blending or mixing chemical substances such as elements and compounds, without chemical bonding or other chemical change, so that each ingredient substance retains its own chemical properties and makeup. Despite the fact that there are no chemical changes to its constituents, the physical properties of a mixture, such as its melting point, may differ from those of the components. Some mixtures can be separated into their components by using physical (mechanical or thermal) means. Azeotropes are one kind of mixture that usually poses considerable difficulties regarding the separation processes required to obtain their constituents (physical or chemical processes or, even a blend of them).

Characteristics of mixtures
All mixtures can be characterized as being separable by mechanical means (e.g. purification, distillation, electrolysis, chromatography, heat, filtration, gravitational sorting, centrifugation). Mixtures differ from chemical compounds in the following ways:
 the substances in a mixture can be separated using physical methods such as filtration, freezing, and distillation;
 there is little or no energy change when a mixture forms (see Enthalpy of mixing);
The substances in a mixture keep its separate properties. 
In the example of sand and water, neither one of the two substances changed in any way when they are mixed. Although the sand is in the water it still keeps the same properties that it had when it was outside the water;
 mixtures have variable compositions, while compounds have a fixed, definite formula;
 when mixed, individual substances keep their properties in a mixture, while if they form a compound their properties can change.

The following table shows the main properties and examples for all possible phase combinations of the three "families" of mixtures:

Homogeneous and heterogeneous mixtures

Mixtures can be either homogeneous or heterogeneous: a mixture in which constituents are distributed uniformly, such as salt in water, is called homogeneous, whereas a mixture whose constituents are clearly separate from one another, such as sand in water, it is called heterogeneous.

In addition, "uniform mixture" is another term for homogeneous mixture and "non-uniform mixture" is another term for heterogeneous mixture. These terms are derived from the idea that a homogeneous mixture has a uniform appearance, or only one visible phase, because the particles are evenly distributed. However, a heterogeneous mixture has non-uniform composition and its constituent substances are easily distinguishable from one another (often, but not always, in different phases).

Several solid substances, such as salt and sugar, dissolve in water to form a special type of homogeneous mixture called a solution, in which there is both a solute (dissolved substance) and solvent (dissolving medium) present. Air is an example of a solution as well: a homogeneous mixture of gaseous nitrogen solvent, in which oxygen and smaller amounts of other gaseous solutes are dissolved. Mixtures are not limited in either their number of substances or the amounts of those substances, though in a homogeneous mixture the solute-to-solvent proportion can only reach a certain point before the mixture separates and becomes heterogeneous.

A homogeneous mixture is characterized by uniform dispersion of its constituent substances throughout; the substances exist in equal proportion everywhere within the mixture. Differently put, a homogeneous mixture will be the same no matter from where in the mixture it is sampled. For example, if a solid-liquid solution is divided into two halves of equal volume, the halves will contain equal amounts of both the liquid medium and dissolved solid (solvent and solute).

In physical chemistry and materials science, "homogeneous" more narrowly describes substances and mixtures which are in a single phase.

Homogeneous mixtures

Solutions

A solution is a special type of homogeneous mixture where the ratio of solute to solvent remains the same throughout the solution and the particles are not visible with the naked eye, even if homogenized with multiple sources. In solutions, solutes will not settle out after any period of time and they can't be removed by physical methods, such as a filter or centrifuge. As a homogeneous mixture, a solution has one phase (solid, liquid, or gas), although the phase of the solute and solvent may initially have been different (e.g., salt water).

Gases
Gases exhibit by far the greatest space (and, consequently, the weakest intermolecular forces) between their atoms or molecules; since intermolecular interactions are minuscule in comparison to those in liquids and solids, dilute gases very easily form solutions with one another. Air is one such example: it can be more specifically described as a gaseous solution of oxygen and other gases dissolved in nitrogen (its major component).

Heterogeneous mixtures
Examples of heterogeneous mixtures are emulsions and foams. In most cases, the mixture consists of two main constituents. For an emulsion, these are immiscible fluids such as water and oil. For a foam, these are a solid and a fluid, or a liquid and a gas. On larger scales both constituents are present in any region of the mixture, and in a well-mixed mixture in the same or only slightly varying concentrations. On a microscopic scale, however, one of the constituents is absent in almost any sufficiently small region. (If such absence is common on macroscopic scales, the combination of the constituents is a dispersed medium, not a mixture.) One can distinguish different characteristics of heterogeneous mixtures by the presence or absence of continuum percolation of their constituents. For a foam, a distinction is made between reticulated foam in which one constituent forms a connected network through which the other can freely percolate, or a closed-cell foam in which one constituent is present as trapped in small cells whose walls are formed by the other constituents. A similar distinction is possible for emulsions. In many emulsions, one constituent is present in the form of isolated regions of typically a globular shape, dispersed throughout the other constituent. However, it is also possible each constituent forms a large connected network. Such a mixture is then called bicontinuous.

Distinguishing between mixture types
Making a distinction between homogeneous and heterogeneous mixtures is a matter of the scale of sampling. On a coarse enough scale, any mixture can be said to be homogeneous, if the entire article is allowed to count as a "sample" of it. On a fine enough scale, any mixture can be said to be heterogeneous, because a sample could be as small as a single molecule. In practical terms, if the property of interest of the mixture is the same regardless of which sample of it is taken for the examination used, the mixture is homogeneous.

Gy's sampling theory quantitatively defines the heterogeneity of a particle as:

During sampling of heterogeneous mixtures of particles, the variance of the sampling error is generally non-zero.

Pierre Gy derived, from the Poisson sampling model, the following formula for the variance of the sampling error in the mass concentration in a sample:

in which V is the variance of the sampling error, N is the number of particles in the population (before the sample was taken), q i is the probability of including the ith particle of the population in the sample (i.e. the first-order inclusion probability of the ith particle), m i is the mass of the ith particle of the population and a i is the mass concentration of the property of interest in the ith particle of the population.

The above equation for the variance of the sampling error is an approximation based on a linearization of the mass concentration in a sample.

In the theory of Gy, correct sampling is defined as a sampling scenario in which all particles have the same probability of being included in the sample. This implies that q i no longer depends on i, and can therefore be replaced by the symbol q. Gy's equation for the variance of the sampling error becomes:

where abatch is that concentration of the property of interest in the population from which the sample is to be drawn and Mbatch is the mass of the population from which the sample is to be drawn.

Health effects 
Air pollution research show biological and health effects after exposure to mixtures are more potent than effects from exposures of individual components.

Homogenization

Properties of a mixture 
 Chemical substance
 Mixing (process engineering)

References 

 

 
Physical chemistry
Chemistry